Pellegrini is an Italian surname.

Geographical distribution
As of 2014, 65.8% of all known bearers of the surname Pellegrini were residents of Italy (frequency 1:1,381), 10.1% of Argentina (1:6,286), 8.5% of Brazil (1:35,648), 8.4% of the United States (1:64,188) and 1.8% of Switzerland (1:6,918).

In Italy, the frequency of the surname was higher than national average (1:1,381) in the following regions:
 1. Tuscany (1:346)
 2. Trentino-Alto Adige/Südtirol (1:615)
 3. Umbria (1:674)
 4. Lazio (1:820)
 5. Marche (1:880)
 6. Lombardy (1:1,096)
 7. Friuli-Venezia Giulia (1:1,296)
 8. Abruzzo (1:1,353)

People
Ada Pellegrini Grinover, Brazilian lawyer
Alain Pellegrini, French general
Alberto Pellegrini, former Italian paralympic fencer
Aldo Pellegrini (general), Italian general
Aldo Pellegrini (poet), Argentine poet, essayist and art critic
Alfred Heinrich Pellegrini, Swiss muralist
Amalia Pellegrini, Italian actress
Angelo Pellegrini, Italian-American food writer
Ann Pellegrini, American professor
Antonio Snider-Pellegrini, French geographer
Armando Pellegrini, Italian racing cyclist
Bob Pellegrini, American football player
Carlo Pellegrini (disambiguation), several people
Carlos Alberto Pellegrini, Argentine-American surgeon
Carlos Pellegrini, Argentine 19th-century politician; president of the country from 1890 to 1892
Charles Pellegrini, Argentine painter
Claudio Pellegrini, Italian physicist
Dan Pellegrini, American politician
Daniella Pellegrini, South African TV presenter
Diego Pellegrini, Italian footballer
Domenico Pellegrini (painter), Italian painter
Ernesto Pellegrini, Italian catering businessman
Federica Pellegrini, Italian swimmer
Georgia Pellegrini, American author
Giacomo Pellegrini, Roman Catholic prelate
Gino Pellegrini, Italian set designer and painter
Gino Pellegrini (musician), Italian American mandolinist and composer
Giovanni Antonio Pellegrini, Italian painter
Giovanni Angelo Pellegrini, Roman Catholic prelate
Glauco Pellegrini, Italian screenwriter
Graziella Pellegrini, Italian stem cell biologist
Guillermo Pellegrini, Argentine equestrian
Héctor Pellegrini, Argentine film actor
Ida Einaudi (1885-1968) born  Countess Ida Pellegrini, First Lady of Italy (May 12, 1948 - May 11, 1955) 
Ines Pellegrini, Italian actress
Jacopo Pellegrini, Italian professional footballer
Joe Pellegrini, American football player
Jorge Pellegrini, Argentine footballer
Lorenzo Pellegrini, Italian footballer
Luca Pellegrini (disambiguation), several people
Lucas Pellegrini, French footballer
Lucio Pellegrini, Italian director
Luigi Pellegrini Scaramuccia, Italian painter
Manuel Pellegrini, Chilean football manager and former player
Marco Pellegrini, Dominican friar
Massimo Pellegrini, Italian footballer
Margaret Pellegrini, American actress
Maria Pellegrini, Canadian operatic soprano
Matías Pellegrini, Argentine footballer
Maurizio Pellegrini, Italian painter
Nicola Pellegrini, Italian artist
Nicolino Pellegrini, Italian musician
Norman Pellegrini, American radio executive
Paolo Pellegrini, Roman Catholic prelate
Peter Pellegrini, Slovakian politician and Prime Minister of the country from March 2018 to March 2020 
Robert Pellegrini, American psychologist
Riccardo Pellegrini, Italian painter
Sara Pellegrini, Italian cross-country skier
Stefano Pellegrini (footballer, born 1953), Italian footballer
Stefano Pellegrini (footballer, born 1967), Italian footballer
Thalia Pellegrini, British TV presenter
Tassilo Pellegrini, professor at the University of St.Pölten, Austria
Tobias Pellegrini, Austrian footballer
Valeriano Pellegrini, Italian soprano castrato
Vincenzo Pellegrini, Italian painter
Walter Pellegrini, Swiss footballer

References

Italian-language surnames
Surnames of Italian origin